Holy Moly (also spelled Holy Moley) is an exclamation of surprise that dates from at least 1892. It is most likely a minced oath, a cleaned-up version of a taboo phrase such as "Holy Moses". 

It was popularized in the U.S. as an expression often used by Billy Batson, the alter ego of Captain Marvel, a superhero created for Fawcett Publications.

References

English words and phrases
Euphemisms